The 2002-03 Euro Ice Hockey Challenge was the first edition of the tournament. 14 countries participated in 12 tournaments, divided into four sessions, which took place in September, November, December, and February.

September session

Riga Tournament
The tournament was played in Riga, Latvia from August 30 to September 1, 2002. It was won by Latvia.

Sëlva Tournament
The tournament was played in Sëlva, Italy from August 30 to September 1, 2002. It was won by Norway.

Nottingham Tournament
The tournament was played in Nottingham, Great Britain from August 30 to September 1, 2002. It was won by Belarus.

November session

Székesfehérvár and Dunaújváros Tournament
The tournament was played in Székesfehérvár and Dunaújváros, Hungary from November 8–10, 2002. It was won by Ukraine.

Asker Tournament
The tournament was played in Asker, Norway from November 8–10, 2002. It was won by Austria.

Trofeo Olivier Lesieur
The tournament was played in Belfort and Mulhouse, France from November 8–10, 2002. It was won by Denmark.

December session

Danzig Tournament
The tournament was played in Danzig, Poland from December 13–15, 2002. It was won by Latvia.

Kyiv Tournament
The tournament was played in Kyiv, Ukraine from December 13–15, 2002. It was won by Belarus.

Bled Tournament
The tournament was played in Bled, Slovenia from December 13–15, 2002. It was won by France.

February session

Villach Tournament
The tournament was played in Villach, Austria from February 7–9, 2003. It was won by Austria.

Minsk Tournament
The tournament was played in Minsk, Belarus from February 7–9, 2003. It was won by Belarus.

Odense Tournament
The tournament was played in Odense, Denmark from February 7–9, 2003. It was won by Denmark

General classification

References

External links
EIHC official website

Challenge